Daniel in the Lions' Den is a painting from around 1615 by the Flemish artist Peter Paul Rubens, now in the National Gallery of Art in Washington DC.

Provenance 
The painting was part of an exchange between the artist and Sir Dudley Carleton (the first Viscount Dorchester). Carleton presented it to King Charles I.

The painting was later owned by the Duke of Hamilton, and it remained at Hamilton Palace in Scotland until 1882, when it was part of the Hamilton Palace sale. At some point between 1882 and 1919, the painting was bought back by the Hamilton family, only for the painting to be included in the final sale of Hamilton Palace in 1919. It was sold in 1963 to the 1st Viscount Cowdray. He then sold it to art dealer M. Knoedler, who sold it to the United States, which passed it on in 1965 to the National Gallery of Art, where it now hangs.

Subject 
The subject is from the Book of Daniel, 6:1–28. Rubens modelled the lions on a Moroccan subspecies, examples of which were then in the Spanish governor's menagerie in Brussels. In 1618, he acquired more than a hundred pieces of classical sculpture, in exchange for this painting, eight others, and a sum of money.

The painting shows Daniel as a young man. However, according to Biblical chronology, Daniel would have been over eighty years old at the time of the incident.

References

External links

Daniel in the Lions' Den

Paintings by Peter Paul Rubens
1615 paintings
Lions in art
Cultural depictions of Daniel (biblical figure)
Collections of the National Gallery of Art
Paintings depicting Hebrew Bible prophets